Giovanni Maria Angiolello was a Venetian traveller, author of an important historical report on the Aq Qoyunlu and early Safavid Persia.

Born around 1451 or 1452 in Vicenza, under the rule of Venice since 1404, Angiolello left Venice in 1468, took part in the defense of Negroponte, besieged by the Ottoman emperor Mehmed II. Enslaved by the Turks, he was taken to Constantinople where he first served the heir apparent, Prince Mustafa, and then the Grand Seraglio. He was with the Ottoman armies in Persia, in the Balkan Peninsula and Asia (1472-1481).

After about 1483 Angiolello’s career is uncertain. He came back to his home town Vicenza, married and became a functionary.

He possibly had two missions (perhaps for the Venetian Republic) or stayed (as an agent or merchant) in Persia around 1482 (after Sultan Mehmed’s death) and then in between 1499 and 1515. He died around 1525.

In addition to a report on his first trip, it is almost certainly the author of a Turkish History (Historia Turchesca), valuable source for the history of the sultanates of Mehmed II and Bayezid II. He left some notices about Gentile Bellini's works in Istanbul.

Notes

References

<

People from Vicenza
1450s births
1520s deaths
14th-century Venetian people
Prisoners of war held by the Ottoman Empire
People of the Ottoman–Venetian Wars